The 2014 World Series of Poker Asia Pacific (WSOP APAC) was held from October 2-18 at Crown Casino in Melbourne, Australia. There were 10 bracelet events, culminating in a $10,000 Main Event and a $25,000 High Roller. This was the second edition of WSOP APAC, and the first under a new schedule which will see this event and WSOP Europe held in alternate years.

Player of the Year
Final standings as of October 18 (end of WSOPAP):

Key

Results

Event #1: $1,100 No Limit Hold'em Accumulator

 4-Day Event: October 2-5
 Number of Entries: 611
 Total Prize Pool: $611,000
 Number of Payouts: 54
 Winning Hand:

Event #2: $2,200 No Limit Hold'em

 3-Day Event: October 4-6
 Number of Entries: 215
 Total Prize Pool: $430,000
 Number of Payouts: 24
 Winning Hand:

Event #3: $1,650 Pot Limit Omaha

 3-Day Event: October 5-7
 Number of Entries: 123
 Total Prize Pool: $184,500
 Number of Payouts: 16
 Winning Hand:

Event #4: $1,650 No Limit Hold'em Terminator

 3-Day Event: October 6-8
 Number of Entries: 250
 Total Prize Pool: $375,000
 Number of Payouts: 31
 Winning Hand:

Event #5: $5,000 Pot Limit Omaha

 3-Day Event: October 7-9
 Number of Entries: 80
 Total Prize Pool: $376,000
 Number of Payouts: 8
 Winning Hand:

Event #6: $1,650 Dealers Choice 8-Game

 3-Day Event: October 8-10
 Number of Entries: 89
 Total Prize Pool: $133,500
 Number of Payouts: 9
 Winning Hand:  (Pot Limit Omaha)

Event #7: $2,200 No Limit Hold'em 6-Max

 3-Day Event: October 9-11
 Number of Entries: 243
 Total Prize Pool: $486,000
 Number of Payouts: 27
 Winning Hand:

Event #8: $5,000 Mixed Event 8-Game

 3-Day Event: October 10-12
 Number of Entries: 48
 Total Prize Pool: $225,600
 Number of Payouts: 6
 Winning Hand:  (No Limit Hold'em)

Event #9: $10,000 No Limit Hold'em Main Event

 6-Day Event: October 12-18
 Number of Entries: 329
 Total Prize Pool: $3,125,500
 Number of Payouts: 36
 Winning Hand:

Event #10: $25,000 High Roller No Limit Hold'em

 3-Day Event: October 15-17
 Number of Entries: 68
 Total Prize Pool: $1,632,000
 Number of Payouts: 8
 Winning Hand:

Notes

World Series of Poker Asia Pacific
2014 in poker